Jolene Ivey (née Stephenson; born July 30, 1961) is an American politician who represented the 47th district in the Maryland House of Delegates from 2007 to 2015. In 2014, she was a candidate for Lieutenant Governor of Maryland, running on the ticket of Maryland Attorney General Doug Gansler. In 2018, she was elected to the Prince George's County Council to represent the 5th district.

Early life and education
She is of mixed-race, born to a white mother and African-American father. However, she was raised by her African-American father and stepmother in Washington, D.C. Ivey graduated from High Point High School in 1978. She earned a Bachelor of Arts degree in mass communication from Towson University in 1982. In 1992, she earned a master's degree in journalism from the University of Maryland, College Park.

Career 
She worked as co-host of Say Baltimore at WMAR-TV in 1983. She was a writer and producer for WMAR from 1984 to 1988. In 1988, she served as then-Congressman Benjamin Cardin's press secretary. She is a freelance writer and director of media relations for the Community Teachers Institute.

During the 2008 presidential campaign, Ivey supported Barack Obama and went to the 2008 Democratic National Convention in Denver, Colorado, as a delegate pledge to Barack Obama.

During her 2006 campaign for the House of Delegates, Ivey was endorsed by The Washington Post and The Gazette, and ran a strong grassroots campaign. She defeated incumbent Rosetta C. Parker.

In 2014, Ivey ran for lieutenant governor as Doug Gansler's running mate. The Gansler–Ivey team lost to the Brown–Ullman campaign in the Democratic primary election.

Maryland House of Delegates 
In the House of Delegates, Ivey, was assigned to the Ways and Means Committee and its election law and revenues subcommittees. She was vice-chair of the Bi-County Committee in the Prince George's County Delegation. She also served in the Legislative Black Caucus of Maryland and the Women Legislators of Maryland.
In her first session in Annapolis, Ivey got her first bill passed and signed into law. HB968 established the Post Adoption Support Services Pilot Program which identifies children eligible for post adoption support services and requires local Departments of Social Services to conduct assessments of the needs of adopted children.

Legislative votes 
voted for the Clean Indoor Air Act of 2007 (HB359)
voted in favor the Tax Reform Act of 2007 (HB2)
voted in favor of prohibiting ground rents in 2007 (SB106)
voted in favor of in-state tuition for students who attended Maryland high schools for at least two years regardless of legal immigration status. (HB6) (2007)
sponsored House Bill 30 in 2007, Establishing the Maryland Education Fund.
de facto-sponsor House Bill 387 in 2009 – Lawful Status in the United States – Material Compliance with Federal Requirements.

Personal life 
Ivey is married to Glenn Ivey, the former state's attorney for Prince George's County. The couple have five children including Julian Ivey, a member of the House of Delegates.

References

1961 births
20th-century African-American people
20th-century African-American women
21st-century African-American politicians
21st-century African-American women
21st-century American politicians
21st-century American women politicians
African-American state legislators in Maryland
African-American women in politics
Candidates in the 2014 United States elections
Living people
Democratic Party members of the Maryland House of Delegates
People from Washington, D.C.
Towson University alumni
University of Maryland, College Park alumni
Women state legislators in Maryland
County commissioners in Maryland